KSMB (94.5 MHz, "94.5 KSMB") is a CHR FM radio station in Lafayette, Louisiana owned by Cumulus Media.  Its studios are located on Galbert Road in Lafayette, and its transmitter is located south of Church Point, Louisiana.

KSMB began broadcasting in 1964 as Lafayette's first FM station. Its call letters stand for Southland Music Broadcasting, the station's original owner company.

Through the 1960s it featured a strictly Cajun, Swamp Pop and Zydeco Americana format. By the 1970s, the station had established an AOR format as "K94 The Stereo Rock!" In late 1984, the format was gradually shifted from AOR to the current legendary Top 40/CHR format, under a new moniker as "HitRadio 94½ The All New KSMB" occurring by October. This branding lasted until 1994, when the current brand name was adopted and shortened moderately as "94.5 KSMB".

Citadel Broadcasting purchased KSMB from Powell Broadcasting in 1999. Citadel merged with Cumulus Media on September 16, 2011.

KSMB is recognized as one of Louisiana's oldest operating radio stations.

References

External links
KSMB website

SMB
Contemporary hit radio stations in the United States
Cumulus Media radio stations
Radio stations established in 1964